= East Mallee =

Australian statistical subdivision

Coordinates: 35°20′32″S 143°33′18″E

East Mallee is a statistical subdivision defined under the Australian Standard Geographical Classification, and therefore used by the Australian Bureau of Statistics. It is one of three subdivisions of the Mallee statistical division of the Australian state of Victoria. It consists of four statistical local areas: Gannawarra (S), Swan Hill (RC) - Central, Swan Hill (RC) - Robinvale and Swan Hill (RC) Bal.
